The karate competition at the 2014 Pan American Sports Festival was held in Tlaxcala, Mexico. The tournament was held from 21–27 July at the Pabellón Comercial Centro Expositor "Adolfo López Mateos".

Medal summary

Men's events

Women's events

References

External links
Website

Pan American Sports Festival
Pan American Sports Festival
Karate